Minister for Regional Development is a position in the government of Western Australia, currently held by Alannah MacTiernan of the Labor Party. The position was first created in 1977, for the government of Charles Court, and has existed in most governments since then. The minister is responsible for the state government's Department of Regional Development.

Prior to the creation of a regional development portfolio, there was a separate minister with responsibility for North-West Australia, called the Minister for North-West. That position has not existed since 1993. Additionally, in the Labor governments of the 1980s, 1990s, and 2000s, either some or all of the regions of Western Australia had specific ministers.

List of regional development ministers

List of ministers for specific regions

Gascoyne

Goldfields-Esperance

Great Southern

Kimberley

Mid-West

North-West

Peel

Pilbara

South-West

Wheatbelt

See also
 Minister for Energy (Western Australia)
 Minister for Mines and Petroleum (Western Australia)
 Minister for State Development (Western Australia)

References
 David Black (2014), The Western Australian Parliamentary Handbook (Twenty-Third Edition). Perth [W.A.]: Parliament of Western Australia.

Regional Development
Minister for Regional Development
1977 establishments in Australia